Amity University, Jharkhand, also known as Amity University, Ranchi, is a private university located in Ranchi, Jharkhand, India. The university was established in 2016 by the Amity Education Group through the Amity University Act, 2016. It offers various undergraduate and postgraduate courses.

See also
Education in India
List of private universities in India
List of institutions of higher education in Jharkhand

References

External links

Universities and colleges in Ranchi
Universities in Jharkhand
Educational institutions established in 2016
2016 establishments in Jharkhand
Private universities in India